Inquisitor cosibensis is an extinct species of sea snail, a marine gastropod mollusk in the family Pseudomelatomidae, the turrids and allies.

Description

Distribution
This extinct marine species was found in Pliocene strata in the Koshiba Formation  at Kanagawa, Japan.

References

 Yokoyama, Matajiro. "Fossils from the Miura Peninsula and its immediate north." Journal of the College of Science, Tokyo Imperial University 39 (1920): 1–198.
 Taki, I. and Oyama, K., 1954: Matajiro Yokoyama's the Pliocene and later faunas from the Kwanto region in Japan. Palaeontological Society of Japan, Special Papers, no. 2, pp. 1–68, pls. 1–49.
 Oyama, K., 1973: Revision of Matajiro Yokoyama's type Mollusca from the Tertiary and Quaternary of the Kanto area. Palaeontological Society of Japan, Special Papers, no. 17, pp. 1–148, pls. 1–57.

External links
 University of Tokyo: Etremopa cosibensis (Yokoyama, 1920)   Lectotype
 University of Tokyo: Inquisitor cosibensis

cosibensis
Gastropods described in 1920